Tilna ML High School, established in 1943, is situated in Tilna, Sapahar Upazila, Naogaon District, Bangladesh.

See also
 Sapahar Government College
 Sapahar Pilot High School, Naogaon
 Al-Helal Islami Academy & College, Sapahar, Naogaon

References

High schools in Bangladesh
Schools in Naogaon District
1958 establishments in East Pakistan